The 1955 World Table Tennis Championships mixed doubles was the 22nd edition of the mixed doubles championship.  

Kálmán Szepesi and Éva Kóczián defeated Aubrey Simons and Helen Elliot in the final by three sets to two.

Results

See also
List of World Table Tennis Championships medalists

References

-